Pyshchevyk is a village in Mariupol Raion (district) in Donetsk Oblast of eastern Ukraine, at about 117 km SSE from the centre of Donetsk city, on the left bank of the Kalmius river.

Demographics
The settlement had 41 inhabitants in 2001. Native language distribution as of the Ukrainian Census of 2001:
Ukrainian: 80.49%
Russian: 19.51%

References

Villages in Mariupol Raion